Sabougla is an unincorporated community in Calhoun County, Mississippi, United States.

History
The community takes its name from Sabougla Creek, which flows near the site. A post office called Sabougla was in operation from 1873 until 1920.

Notable person
Leo Welch, a gospel blues musician and guitarist, was born at Sabouga in 1932.

References

Unincorporated communities in Mississippi
Unincorporated communities in Calhoun County, Mississippi
Mississippi placenames of Native American origin